Mark IV is a Barbershop quartet that won the 1969 SPEBSQSA international competition.

Discography
Mark IV – AIC Masterworks CD (CD)

References 
 AIC entry (archived)
 Barbershop Wiki

Barbershop quartets
Barbershop Harmony Society